Anastasios Kissas (born 18 January 1988 in Nicosia, Cyprus) is a Cypriot international footballer who plays as a goalkeeper for Nea Salamina.

Career

APOEL
Kissas made his debut for APOEL in a domestic cup match in 2005 at the age of seventeen.

During his career with APOEL, Kissas won seven championships, four Cups and four Super Cups. He was also a member of APOEL squad when the club reached the 2009–10, 2014–15 UEFA Champions League group stages and the quarter-finals of the 2011–12 UEFA Champions League but he didn't appear in any single match.

On 26 May 2016, after ten years in the club, Kissas contract with APOEL was mutually terminated.

Apollon Limassol
On 1 June 2016, Kissas Joined fellow Cypriot First Division club Apollon Limassol on a one-year contract with the option of a further season.

International career
Kiisas made his international debut with Cyprus National Team on 16 November 2010, in a friendly match against Jordan at King Abdullah Stadium, coming on as a 54th-minute substitute in Cyprus' 0–0 draw.

Honours
 APOEL
Cypriot First Division (7) : 2006–07, 2008–09, 2010–11, 2012–13, 2013–14, 2014–15, 2015–16
Cypriot Cup (4) : 2005–06, 2007–08, 2013–14, 2014–15
Cypriot Super Cup (4) : 2008, 2009, 2011, 2013

References

External links
 
 
 UEFA Profile
 

1988 births
Living people
Sportspeople from Nicosia
Greek Cypriot people
Cypriot footballers
Association football goalkeepers
Cypriot First Division players
APOEL FC players
Apollon Limassol FC players
Cyprus under-21 international footballers
Cyprus international footballers